Kapanda Airport  is an airport serving the Capanda Dam project near Kapanda, a village in Malanje Province, Angola.

Airlines and destinations

See also

 List of airports in Angola
 Transport in Angola

References

External links 
OpenStreetMap - Capanda
OurAirports - Capanda

Airports in Angola